HD 85512 is a solitary K-type main-sequence star  away in the constellation Vela. It is about 1 billion years older than the Sun. It is extremely chromospherically inactive, only slightly more active than Tau Ceti. It exhibits a long-term variability and was thought to host one low-mass planet, although this is now doubtful.

Position
HD 85512 lies in Vela, 3′32″ west of and 10′54″ north of LZ Velorum (HD 86005), a chromospherically active giant, variable star, at 2090 light years away, of orange-to-red color and similarly average magnitude.

Planetary system

On August 19, 2011, a ≥3.6 Earth-mass planet was discovered using HARPS that is "just inside" the habitable zone, along with the inner planets of e (or 82 G.) Eridani, and HD 192310 c in Capricornus. These two other systems are closer to Earth than this system. Modelling at the time of the discovery announcement found that the planet could be cool enough to host liquid water if it has more than 50% cloud coverage, but with revised models of the habitable zone two years later it was found to be too hot to be potentially habitable. For a time it ranked fifth-best for habitability in the Planetary Habitability Laboratory's Habitable Exoplanets Catalog, which later listed it in an article about "false starts" in the search for potentially habitable exoplanets.

In 2023, a study reassessed the radial velocity data of HD 85512. A signal was detected with a period of 51 days, inconsistent with the previously published 58-day orbital period of HD 85512 b, but consistent with previous estimates of the stellar rotation period. This indicates that the signal is very likely to be caused by the stellar rotation, rather than an orbiting planet.

References

Notes

External links
 

 
Vela (constellation)
085512
048331
0370
K-type main-sequence stars
Hypothetical planetary systems
Durchmusterung objects
J09510700-4330097